Alberto Pascaleo, O.P. or Alberto Pascaleo de Utino (died 1543) was a Roman Catholic prelate who served as Bishop of Chioggia (1540–1543) and Bishop of Rethymo (1540–1543).

Biography
Alberto Pascaleo was ordained a priest in the Order of Preachers. On 29 October 1537, he was appointed during the papacy of Pope Paul III as Bishop of Rethymo. On 5 November 1540, he was appointed during the papacy of Pope Paul III as Bishop of Chioggia.  He served as Bishop of Chioggia until his death in December 1543.

References

External links
  (for Chronology of Bishops)
  (for Chronology of Bishops)
 (for Chronology of Bishops) 
 (for Chronology of Bishops) 

16th-century Roman Catholic bishops in the Republic of Venice
Bishops appointed by Pope Paul III
1543 deaths
Dominican bishops